The 15th Pan American Games were held in Rio de Janeiro, Brazil from 13 July 2007 to 29 July 2007.

Medals

Gold

Women's Kumite (– 53 kg): Cheili González

Mixed Hobie Cat 16: Juan Ignacio Maegli and Cristina Guirola

Silver

Men's Marathon: José Amado García

Men's Singles Competition: Kevin Cordón

Women's – 67 kg: Heidy Juarez

Bronze

Men's Doubles Competition: Erick Anguiano and Pedro Yang

Men's – 58 kg: José Rosal

Results by event

Triathlon

Men's Competition
Carlos Friely
 did not finish — no ranking

See also
Guatemala at the 2008 Summer Olympics

External links
Rio 2007 Official website

Nations at the 2007 Pan American Games
P
2007